The Main Street Historic District is located in Waupaca, Wisconsin.

Description
The district is a commercial one with 43 contributing properties including the 1868 Hansen Wagon Shop mentioned above, the 1877 Italianate-styled Masonic Meeting Hall the 1881 Jensen Meat Market, the 1883 Pinkerton Block which housed Nordvi's General Store the 1893 Queen Anne-styled Waupaca County National Bank, the 1896 Peterson Saloon, and the 1919 Godfrey Auto Company.

It was added to the State and the National Register of Historic Places in 2002.

References

Historic districts on the National Register of Historic Places in Wisconsin
National Register of Historic Places in Waupaca County, Wisconsin